Rough Trade Records is an independent record label based in London, England. It was formed in 1976 by Geoff Travis who had opened a record store off Ladbroke Grove. Having successfully promoted and sold records by punk rock and early post-punk and indie pop bands such as the Normal and Desperate Bicycles, Travis began to manage acts and distribute bands such as Scritti Politti and began the label, which was informed by left-wing politics and structured as a co-operative. Soon after, Rough Trade also set up a distribution arm that serviced independent retail outlets across Britain, a network that became known as the Cartel. In 1983, Rough Trade signed the Smiths.

Interest and investment of major labels in the UK indie scene in the late 1980s, as well as overtrading on behalf of Rough Trade's distribution wing, led to cash flow problems, and eventually to bankruptcy, forcing the label into receivership. However, Travis resurrected the label in the late 1990s, finding success with the Libertines, the Strokes and Antony and the Johnsons. The roster has been diverse, ranging stylistically through alternative rock, post-punk and new wave, garage rock, and psychedelic rock, but also art pop, folk, electronic, and soul.

History

Rough Trade began as a record shop, opened by Geoff Travis on Kensington Park Road, West London, in February 1976, with Travis reportedly taking the label name from the Canadian art punk/new wave band Rough Trade. It was inspired by what Travis has described as the "community-based environment" of the City Lights Bookstore in San Francisco, and specialised in garage rock and reggae. Steve Montgomery, initially a customer of the shop, was offered a job soon after it opened and became its effective co-manager. Travis and Montgomery were joined by a further employee, Richard Scott, in June 1977.

Rough Trade produced its own record for the first time after French punk band Métal Urbain came into the shop asking for assistance in publicising their music. In 1978, the shop began organising a record distribution network, dubbed "The Cartel", in collaboration with other independent record stores in the UK. This network enabled small record labels such as Factory Records and 2 Tone Records to sell their releases nationally. It specialised primarily in European post-punk and other alternative rock of the late 1970s and early 1980s. It also distributed & sold a range of contemporary British fanzines such as Sniffin’ Glue, No Cure, Vague, Acts of Defiance, Love and Molotov Cocktails, Attack on Bzag, Ded Yampy and Alternative Sounds.

The Rough Trade label subsequently issued a single by Jamaican reggae singer Augustus Pablo, the debut EP by Sheffield band Cabaret Voltaire and the second Stiff Little Fingers single, "Alternative Ulster". During 1978, the label released singles by the Monochrome Set, Subway Sect, Swell Maps, Electric Eels, Spizzoil and Kleenex. In 1979, Rough Trade's first album, Inflammable Material by Stiff Little Fingers, reached number 14 in the UK charts and became the first independently released album to sell over 100,000 copies in the UK. Rough Trade's significance by this time was such that it was made the subject of a South Bank Show documentary.

In 1982, the retail outlets broke with the A&R and distribution divisions, after a decision to allow the shop staff buy out. The distribution wing found itself overtrading by 1991 and shortages of cash flow led to a filing for bankruptcy. The entire company ended up in receivership.

Rough Trade Records was relaunched in 2000 as an independently owned entity, a partnership between Travis, Jeanette Lee (a former member of Public Image Ltd.), and minority partners Sanctuary Records, as a part of the Zomba Group until 11 June 2002 when BMG bought out this business. Prior to the BMG buyout, Rough Trade Records released the Strokes' debut EP The Modern Age in the spring of 2001.  In July 2007 Sanctuary Records then sold Rough Trade to the Beggars Group for £800,000 making Rough Trade independent once again. However, it can be argued that Rough Trade is not truly independent as it is owned by another company. Rough Trade is more accurately a subsidiary that is owed by Beggars Group, which in turn is a privately held company not publicly traded on the stock market.

Since its rebirth and partnership with the Beggars Group, Rough Trade has re-confirmed their place in the marketplace with recording acts such as Warpaint, Howler, Pantha Du Prince, Emiliana Torrini, Dean Blunt, Belle and Sebastian, Stray Heart and more.

Artists

References

Further reading
 Cavanagh, David. The Creation Records Story: My Magpie Eyes Are Hungry for the Prize. London: Virgin Books, 2000. .
 Savage, Jon. England's Dreaming: The Sex Pistols and Punk Rock London: Faber and Faber, 1991. 
 Taylor, Neil. Document and Eyewitness: An Intimate History of Rough Trade Hachette UK, 2010, 
 Young, Rob. Rough Trade. Black Dog Publishing,

External links
 
 TV documentary from 1979 exploring the company's early ideals and development

 
Record labels established in 1978
Record labels disestablished in 1991
Record labels established in 2000
Re-established companies
Beggars Group
Alternative rock record labels
Indie rock record labels
New wave record labels
Zomba Group of Companies subsidiaries
British independent record labels